Daniel Cohen (born 16 June 1953 in Tunis, French Tunisia) is a French economist and a professor at the Paris School of Economics as well as a senior advisor to the bank Lazard.

Works
Monnaie, Richesse et Dette des Nations, Editions du CNRS, 1987.
Private Lending to Sovereign States, MIT Press, 1991.
Les infortunes de la Prospérité, Paris: Julliard, 1994. (translation MIT Press).
Richesse du monde, pauvretés des nations, Flammarion, 1997 (translation MIT Press).
Nos Temps Modernes, Flammarion, 2000 (traduction MIT Press, et en 8 autres langues).
La mondialisation et ses ennemis, 2004, Paris, Grasset (translation MIT Press).
Trois leçons sur la société post-industrielle, Sept 2006, Paris, Seuil. (Spanish translation: Tres lecciones sobre la sociedad postindustrial, Buenos Aires/Madrid, Katz editores S.A, 2007)
27 Questions d'économie contemporaine (Tome 1), under the direction of Philippe Askenazy and Daniel Cohen 2008
La Prospérité du vice, Une introduction (inquiète) à l'économie 2009
16 nouvelles questions d'économie contemporaine (Tome 2), with Philippe Askenazy and Daniel Cohen 2010
Le monde est clos et le desir infini, Paris: Albin Michel, 2015

Awards and distinctions 
 Laureat of the Association française de sciences économiques (1987)
 American Express Special Merit Award (1987)
 Le Nouvel économiste "Economist of the Year" (1997)
 Prix Léon Faucher from the Académie des sciences morales et politiques (2000)
 Prix du Livre d’économie (2000)
 Laureat du prix européen (2000)
 Prix Synapsis for the book Mutation et travail (2000)
 Legion of Honour - Knight (11 April 2001)
 Brussels Lectures in Economics (2003)

References

External links

1953 births
Living people
French economists
École Normale Supérieure alumni
Paris Nanterre University alumni
Officiers of the Légion d'honneur
People from Tunis